Policocnemis is a monotypic moth genus of the family Noctuidae. Its only species, Policocnemis ungulatus, is found in the US state of Texas. Both the genus and species were first described by Foster Hendrickson Benjamin in 1932.

References

Cuculliinae
Monotypic moth genera